The Archdeacon of Malmesbury is a senior ecclesiastical officer within the Diocese of Bristol. As such she or he is responsible for the disciplinary supervision of the clergy within its four rural deaneries: Chippenham, Kingswood and South Gloucestershire, North Wiltshire and Swindon. Christopher Bryan has been the incumbent since 2019.

History
The Archdeaconry of North Wilts was created from the Archdeaconry of Bristol in the Diocese of Bristol by Order-in-Council on 12 August 1904 and renamed the Archdeaconry of Swindon on 30 May 1919, due to the bishop's concern over confusion with the similarly named Archdeaconry of Wilts in Salisbury diocese. In 1999, Alan Hawker, the last recorded Archdeacon of Swindon became the first recorded Archdeacon of Malmesbury; the current Malmesbury archdeaconry covers a very similar area to the 1904 North Wilts archdeaconry.

John Sherman (d. 1671) was said (once, in 1814) to have succeeded Joshua Childrey as "Archdeacon of North Wiltshire" while serving as chaplain to Seth Ward, Bishop of Salisbury; it is well-recorded that Sharman succeeded Childrey as Archdeacon of Salisbury in 1670.

List of archdeacons
At its creation, the archdeaconry was called North Wilts.
1904–1909 (res.): Hemming Robeson
1910–1919 (ret.): Ravenscroft Stewart
From 30 May 1919, the archdeaconry was renamed Swindon.
1919–1928 (res.): Reginald Talbot
1928–1947 (ret.): Ronald Ramsay (also Bishop suffragan of Malmesbury, 1927–1946)
1947–1963 (ret.): Leonard Cornwell (afterwards archdeacon emeritus)
1963–1969 (res.): Cyril Bowles
1970–1973 (res.): Freddy Temple
1974–1982 (ret.): Jeffrey Maples (afterwards archdeacon emeritus)
1982–1992 (ret.): Kenneth Clark
1992–1997 (res.): Michael Middleton
1998–1999: Alan Hawker (became Archdeacon of Malmesbury)
Since 1999, the archdeaconry has been called Malmesbury.
19991 November 2010 (ret.): Alan Hawker (previously Archdeacon of Swindon; afterwards archdeacon emeritus)
1 November 2010 – 2011 (Acting): Hedley Ringrose
201130 September 2018 (ret.): Christine Froude (also Acting Archdeacon of Bristol from December 2012)
from January 2013 until 1 April 2015, Derek Chedzey was part-time Assistant Archdeacon for the diocese
4 October 20182019: Graham Archer (Acting)
7 May 2019present: Christopher Bryan

References 

Lists of Anglicans
 
Diocese of Bristol
Lists of English people